Women's role in the Democratization of South Korea is a topic that has been rarely discussed and rarely acknowledged. Women's participation in civil society has contributed to the process of the development of democracy in South Korea. Additionally, the democratization movement can be described as the increasing participation of marginalized groups such as women. Having said that, democratization was an outlet for women to transform their grievances into actual collective action. With the help of democratization, these activisms were made possible because it opened up tons of opportunities for civil society (aka "voluntary associations"). Unfortunately, although women have played a role in the Democratization of South Korea, there were still internal and external problems that hindered their growth and development.

Background Information 
The democratization movement is also known as the Gwangju Democratization Movement. This has been characterized as the transition from authoritarian rule to a democratic government. This movement started with the death of the President of South Korea in 1979, President Park Chung-Hee. The product being that multiple social democratic movements arose. As stated before, since there was an unforeseen shift of government rule, politics after this assassination became unstable. Democratization has been systematically maintained through masculine institutionalized politics and women's participations have been silenced. A term that has been circulating South Korea since the inauguration of Kim Young Sam's government in 1993 has been "democratization," or minjuhwa. However, there are still doubts as to whether or not the Democratization of South Korea benefits women empowerment. Due to the fact that democracy is usually inclined to patriarchy, according to Seungsook Moon, the shift to this form of government has left women in a season of instability. Due to the detachment of South Korea from the U.S. troops, women's opinions are most effective. Katharine H.S. Moon argues that because of this features of the democratization movement of being "anti-troop...women's movements have narrowed the political space for gender-specific activism" and women's leadership addresses "the rights and needs for the very women whose lives are most intimately affected by the presence and conduct of U.S. troops."

Korean Women's Associations United (KWAU) 
Women's groups started to gather in hopes to tackle gender inequality. One of the most popular groups were founded through Christian foundations. These women was against the conservative state and geared toward feminist views. They focused on meeting the needs and interests of women who have experienced gender inequality during democratization, such as factory workers, housewives, etc. Throughout the process of democratization, the conflict between the KWAU and the state turned into negotiations instead. After the inauguration of Kim Dae Jung in 1998, women of the KWAU were chosen for government office. Due to this, KWAU began to pay lots of attention to "local and national elections in the interests of influencing law-making and policy-making processes." Scholars, such as Seungsook Moon, claims that the political transition from authoritarian to democratic worked simultaneously to develop women's associations such as KWAU.

Problems 

 Thin grass-roots base. This means that KWAU does not have much influence in politics yet. 
 Small membership: there was a low population in the KWAU
 Lack of resources and public interest in social activism

This data shows how sexual crimes are rarely reported. The KWAU is working to eliminate discrimination against women in regards to their human rights.

Women's Society for Democracy 

In the Republic of Korea (aka South Korea), women's rights movement were mainly focused around "equity and labor exploitation." Those who supported democracy, like the Party for Peace and Democracy, were deemed as those who were anti-government. Women's Society for Democracy is one of the bigger branches of the KWAU and founded in 1987. This group is a multi-issued women's rights group led by Professor Lee Hyo Jae and the President of KWAU, Oo Jeong. They were modeled after the Women's Society for Justice and Equality which failed due to internal issues. Such issues included disagreements between which topics were most important: social injustices like labor reform vs. political democratic reform. However, in order for these changes in equality to become a reality, radical women's groups in Korea state that things like general human rights issues, democratization, and the reunification of North Korea must occur first.

Focused Issues 

 Labor rights
 Prostitution
 Sex torture
 Altering family law

Other Radical Groups 

 Korea's Women's Workers Association
 Korean Catholic Farmers
 Women's Committee
 Women's Hotline
 Focuses only on ONE thing: Problems with spouse battering, rape, prostitution, sex violations, etc.
 Women's Newspaper

Some scholars and citizens of South Korea stated that the shifting of attitudes towards women through other women and men, increased the consciousness of social democracy. Additionally, the Asian Survey conducted by Palley states that "the women in the radical women's organizations believe that women can only achieve their goal of equal status with men if there is a change in the political mechanism."

Women's Participation Effects Towards Women 
During the Democratization movement, women kept their roles in their political spaces as mothers and wives. Women's political involvement influenced the end-goal of progressive women's movement groups in the 1980s. With this discourse, scholars mainly focused on class differences rather than Gender Politics and Women's Activism. Why are these discourses neglected? The reasons include that as these movements were rising so were "male-dominant labor uprisings in heavy industries," and there was a lack of attention because women struggles were seen as less threatening and less important. Additionally, there was a lack of historical data. This was because of low population in these women's groups and a lack of understanding of the importance of this groups' goals. According to Jeong-Lim Nam, "women's participation in the democratic labor movement in the 1980s has been underrecorded and underdocumented compared to men's participation." On that note, many scholars find it hard to believe that women's activisms helped promote "democratization and political changes in South Korea." The main women's groups were "dominated by highly educated, middle-class women," so these specific women isolated themselves from the working-class population of women. In light of this, middle-class women's group shared different goals. Middle-class women sought for "the elevation of women's rights rather than on the pursuit of political transformation and class-based equality."

What Needs to Be Done? 
Because there are diverse women's groups that seek to dissolve military rule and ultimately reconstruct a democratic society, there are obstacles that still need to be overcome. Jeong-Lim Nam believes research must be done to see how these groups of women work their way around the democratic system, to see if there is room in these institutions to include women, and whether or not they will be equally accepted into these male dominant spheres. Ultimately, the patriarchal system does not disappear merely because the governance system has transitioned. To start, Lee and Chin state that women's groups were successful because "they chose to work with the new institutions and parties." Therefore, women's participation in politics and social movements is based on how well they adapt to the transition from authoritarian to democratic.

References 

Women in South Korea
South Korean democracy movements